ABC is an Albanian free-to-air television channel based in Tirana. It was founded in 2010 on the frequency of the defunct Italian-Albanian channel Telenorba Shqiptare and in 2019 was acquired by ABC Management sh.p.k. It is part of the ABC Media Group, together with Television 7 (T7) and Gazeta Express (gazetaexpress.com) in Kosovo. ABC News Radio, a radio relay channel is available on 105.0 FM in Tirana.

Programs
Apart from the news programs, ABC News features several programs on its channel.

See also

 Television in Albania
 Communication in Albania
 TV Klan
 Vizion Plus
 Tring
 Tip TV
 Tring Sport
 Klan Kosova
Telenorba Shqiptare, defunct channel occupying same frequency

References

External links
 

2010 establishments in Albania
Television networks in Albania
Albanian-language television stations
Television channels and stations established in 2010
24-hour television news channels